This is a list of English words borrowed or derived from Portuguese (or Galician-Portuguese). The list also includes words derived from other languages via Portuguese during and after the Age of Discovery. In other Romance language their imports from Portuguese are often, in a creative shorthand, called lusitanianisms a word which has fallen out of use in English linguistics as etymologists stress that few additions to any non-Iberian Peninsula languages date to the era when the Lusitanian language was spoken. Loan-words and derivations predominantly date to the Age of Discovery when the Portuguese spoken at sea was, according to many accounts, the most widely understood tongue (lingua franca) of the Indian and Atlantic Oceans.

A-E
Açaí from Portuguese açaí, from Tupi-Guarani asaí
Ainhum from Portuguese, based on Yoruba eyun 'saw'
Albacore from albacor from Arabic  al-bukr (= "the young camels")
Albatross an alteration of albatroz, under influence of the Latin word albus ("white")
Albino from albino, with the same meaning, from Latin albus
Amah  from Portuguese ama, nurse, housemaid, from Medieval Latin amma, mother
Anhinga from Portuguese, from Tupi áyinga
Anil  from anil, through French, via Arabic النيل al-nili and Persian نیلا nila; ultimately from Sanskrit नीली nili (= "indigo)
Auto-da-fé  a judicial 'act' or sentence of the Inquisition from auto da fé (= "act/sentence of faith")
Ayah  Anglo-Indian native nurse, children's governess from Port. aia, originally from Latin avia (grandmother). Etymogically related to English "uncle"
Banana from Portuguese, of African origin; akin to Wolof banäna banana
Banyan from Portuguese, from Gujarati vāṇiyo, from Sanskrit "vaṇij"
Baroque  from barroco (adj. = "unshapely")
Bossa nova (= "new trend" or "new wave")
Breeze probably from Old Spanish and Portuguese briza 'northeastern wind
Bual from boal
Buccaneer from French boucanier, from boucaner, ("to cure meat"), from boucan, ("barbecue frame"), of Tupian origin, mukém, ("rack"), via Portuguese moquém.
Buffalo from Portuguese búfalo, from late Latin bufalus, from Greek boubalos 'antelope, wild ox'
Cachalot  from Portuguese cachalote (same meaning), probably via Spanish or French. The Portuguese word comes from cachola ("head" or "big head")
Cachou from French, from Portuguese cachu, from Malay kacu
Caipirinhaalcoholic cocktail from Brazil spread throughout the world consisting of lime, sugar, cachaça and ice
Capoeira a popular Brazilian dance of African origin incorporating martial arts movements
Carambola Star fruit - Portuguese, perhaps from Marathi कराम्बल karambal
Caramel  via French and Spanish, from Portuguese caramelo, 'caramel', from Late Latin calamellus. Typical Portuguese rhotacism of the letter "L".
Caravel from caravela
Carbonado from Portuguese
Carnauba from carnaúba
Cashew from caju (a tropical fruit)
Caste  from casta (= "class")
Cobra  shortening of cobra-de-capelo, with the same meaning (literally, "snake [cobra] with a hood")
Coconut  from coco + nut 
Commando  from comando 'command'
Cougar  from French couguar, from Portuguese suçuarana, perhaps from Tupian sɨwasuarána or Guaraní guaçu ara.
Creole  French créole, from Castilian Spanish criollo, person native to a locality, from Portuguese crioulo, diminutive of cria, ("'person raised in one's house with no blood relation, a servant'"), < Portuguese criar ("'to rear, to raise, to bring up'"), from Latin creare, to beget; < Latin creo ("'to create'"), which came into English via French between 1595 and 1605. [same root as creature]
Cuspidor from Portuguese, spitter, from cuspir 'to spit'
Dodo According to Encarta Dictionary and Chambers Dictionary of Etymology, "dodo" comes from Portuguese doudo (currently, more often, doido) meaning "fool" or "crazy". The present Portuguese word dodô ("dodo") is of English origin. The Portuguese word doudo or doido may itself be a loanword from Old English (cp. English "dolt")
Embarrass  from Portuguese embaraçar (same meaning; also to tangle - string or rope), from em + baraço (archaic for "rope")
Emu from ema (= "rhea")

F-N
Farofa  typical dish of Brazil
Feijoada  typical Portuguese and Brazilian stew. Used during the 2014 Scripps National Spelling Bee.
Fetish  from French fétiche, from Portuguese feitiço ("charm", "sorcery", "spell"), from Latin factitius or feticius ("artificial")
Flamingo from Portuguese flamingo, from Spanish flamenco
Genipapo from Portuguese jenipapo, from Tupi
Grouper from garoupa
Guarana from Portuguese guaraná, from Tupi warana
Igarapé  from Tupi : Area with trees near of rivers with the roots in the water.
Indigo from Spanish indico, Portuguese endego, and Dutch (via Portuguese) indigo, from Latin indicum, from Greek indikon 'blue dye from India'
Jacaranda from Tupi yakaranda.
Jackfruit from Portuguese jaca, from Malayalam chakka + fruit
Jaggery from Portuguese xagara, jag(a)ra, from Malayalam cakkarā, from Sanskrit śarkarā
Jaguar from Tupi or Guaraní jaguarete via Portuguese
Junk from junco, from Javanese djong (Malay adjong).
Konpeitō Japanese sweets, from the Portuguese confeito (sugar candy)
Labrador from the name of Portuguese explorer João Fernandes Lavrador, the surname meaning "landowner" or "farmer".
Lacquer from French lacre, from Portuguese lacre, from Arabic lakk, from Persian lak
Lambada from lambada (="beating, lashing")
Lascar from Portuguese lascari, from Urdu and Persian laškarī 'soldier', from laškar 'army'.
Launch from Portuguese lancha, from Malay lancharan 'boat'.
Lingo perhaps from Old Portuguese lingoa, today's língua, ("language", "tongue") related to Old Provençal lengo, lingo. Or perhaps, from Polari slang, ultimately from Italian lingua franca. Polari is a distinctive English argot in use since at least the 18th century among groups of theatrical and circus performers and in certain homosexual communities, derived largely from Italian, directly or through Lingua Franca. Sailors' expressions from the 16th century passed on to 19th century English 'gay' culture, and vaudeville theatrical world, including words derived from a variety of sources such as Italian, Romani, Yiddish, and British rhyming slang.
Macaque from macaco, through French
Macaw from macau; ultimately from Tupi macavuana.
Mandarin from mandarim, from the Malay mantri, from Hindi मंत्री matri, from Sanskrit मन्त्रिन् mantrin (="counsellor")
Mango from manga, via Malay mangga, ultimately from Malayalam മാങ്ങ māṅṅa or from Tamil மாங்காய் mānkāy
Mangrove  probably from Portuguese mangue mangrove (from Spanish mangle, probably from Taino) + English grove
Manioc from mandioca (="cassava") from Tupi mandioca.
Maraca from maracá from Tupi
Marimba from Portuguese, of Bantu origin; akin to Kimbundu ma-rimba : ma-, pl. n. pref. + rimba, xylophone, hand piano
Marmalade from marmelada, a preserve made from marmelo (="quince")
Molasses from melaço (="treacle")
Monsoon from monção
Mosquito from Mosquito meaning 'little fly'
Mulatto Portuguese mulato. From mula (=mule) a cross between a horse and a donkey or from the Arabic term muwallad, which means "a person of mixed ancestry"
Negro Negro means "black" in Spanish and Portuguese being from the Latin word niger (Dative nigro, Accusative nigrum) and the Greek word Νέγρος Negros both of the same meaning. It came to English through the Portuguese and Spanish slave trade. Prior to the 1970s, it was the dominant term for Black people of African origin; in most English language contexts (except its inclusion in the names of some organizations founded when the term had currency, e.g. the United Negro College Fund), it is now considered either archaic or a slur.

P-Z
Pagoda from pagode; corruption of Persian بوتکاتا butkata (+"idol deity")
Palanquin from Portuguese palanquim, from Oriya pālaṅki
Palaver a chat, from palavra (="word"), Portuguese palavra (word), parabola (parable), speech (current fala, discurso), chat (current bate-papo, papo, palavrinha, conversa and also Eng. chat)  alteration of Late Latin parabola, speech, parable.
Pickaninny from pequenina (="little one") or pequeninha (="toddler")
Piranha from piranha (=piranha), from Tupi pirá ("fish") + ánha ("cut")
Pomfret from Portuguese pampo
Potato from "batata"
Ramkie from Afrikaans, from Nama rangi-b, perhaps from Portuguese rabequinha diminutive of rabeca 'fiddle'
Rapadura from Portuguese raspar
Sablefish from sável (="shad," "whitefish")
Samba from samba ; ultimately of Angolan origin, semba
Sargasso from sargaço (="sargasso")
Savvy from sabe he knows, from saber to know
Serval from French, from Portuguese (lobo-)cerval 'Iberian lynx', from Latin cervarius
Stevedore from estivador (="stevedore")
Talapoin from French, from Portuguese talapão
Tank from tanque
Tapioca from tapioca
Teak from teca
Tempura Japanese 天麩羅, tenpura?, also written as "天ぷら", from Portuguese têmporas, (=Ember Days)
Verandah from varanda (="balcony" or "railing"), from Hindi वरांडा varanda or Bengali baranda
Vindaloo probably from Portuguese vin d'alho 'wine and garlic (sauce)', from vinho 'wine' + alho 'garlic' or possibly from vinagre 'vinegar' + alho 'garlic'
Yam from inhame or Spanish ñame from West African nyama (="eat")
Zebra from zebra (same meaning), which started as the feminine form of zebro (a kind of deer), from vulgar Latin eciferus, classical Latin EQUIFERVS.
Zombie  from the word "zumbi", first recorded in 1819 in a history of Brazil by the poet Robert Southey. This word is given West African origin by the Oxford English Dictionary, and was incorporated into the Portuguese language by interaction with African slaves in Brazil.

See also
 Lists of English words by country or language of origin

References

Portuguese
English words